Mavila Vishwanathan Nair (born on 3 March 1952) is the Chairman of the Credit Information Bureau of India Limited, India's largest credit bureau. He is also an advisor in select private equity and ventures capital-funded companies in India.

Previously a banker, Nair was one of the longest-serving chairmen in the history of Indian banking, having served as chairman and managing director of Union Bank of India for six years and Dena Bank for one year.

Early life and education
The second eldest of seven siblings. Nair was born in Kasaragod, Kerala, and grew up in Mangalore, Karnataka, graduating from St. Aloysius College, Mangalore. Later, he attended trainings at the Indian Institute of Management Ahmedabad, Indian School of Business, Kellogg School of Management, and Harvard Business School.

Career

Corporation Bank (1973–2004)
Nair joined Corporation Bank as a probationary officer in 1973.  He worked across Hyderabad, Gujarat and Mangalore and was then deputed to head one bank's largest branches in New Delhi.

He subsequently went on to head the western and central region of the bank. Both the regions were the best performing regions of the bank during his tenure. After stints in the field, Nair was called on to set up a strategic business unit to boost-fee based income and to position Corporation Bank as a leading player in corporate banking. Nair set up the Collection and Payment Services (CAPS), which created a market advantage for the bank and positioned it as a leading player in corporate banking in India.

Nair also headed various departments at the corporate office, including CAPS, Human Resources (HR), and Risk Management.

He was subsequently elevated to Executive Director of Dena Bank.

Dena Bank (2004–2006)
Executive Director, subsequently chairman and managing director

Nair was promoted as Executive Director to Dena Bank when the bank was facing a severe challenge on the non-performing assets (NPA) front. He subsequently served as chairman and was with the bank for 2 years.

Union Bank (2006–2012)
Chairman and managing director

Nair joined Union Bank of India as chairman and managing director.

Nair was appointed Chairman of the Indian Banks’ Association for 2009–2010. During this period, as chairman of the wage negotiation committee, IBA successfully concluded the long pending bipartite settlement with the joint forum of unions.

Personal life
M. V. Nair lived with his wife Indu in Mumbai, India. They have a daughter, Vidhya and a son, Aditya.

Positions held
 Chairman, Credit Information Bureau of India Limited (CIBIL) (2011–present)
 Chairman, Society for Worldwide Interbank Financial Telecommunications (SWIFT) (2013–Present)
 Chairman, Bankers' Quotient Academy (2013–Present)
 Chairman, Indian Banks’ Association (IBA) (2009–2010)
 Chairman, Wage Negotiation Committee, Indian Banks’ Association (2008–2010)
 Member, Sub-Group on Financial Services under the High Level Group on Services Sector, constituted by Planning Commission, Government of India (2007–2008)
 Member, Primary Markets Advisory Committee, set up by Securities Exchange Board of India (SEBI) (2009–2010)
 Chairman, Committee on Priority Sector Lending constituted by Reserve Bank of India (2011–2012)
 Chairman, Union KBC Asset Management Company (2010–2012)
 Director, General Insurance Corporation (GIC) Re (2009–2012)
 Member, Managing Committee, Indian Banks' Association (Mumbai)
 Chairman of the Governing Board, Institute of Banking Personnel Selection (IBPS) (2009–2012)
 Vice-President of Indian Institute of Banking & Finance (IIBF) & Chairman of its Executive Committee, (2008–2012)
 Member, Governing Council of Overseas Indian Facilitation Centre (OIFC) established by the Ministry of Overseas Indian Affairs, Government of India (2010–2012)
 Member of the Governing Council, Institute for Development and Research in Banking Technology (IDRBT)
 Member, Governing Board, National Institute of Bank Management(NIBM) (2008–2012)
 College Advisory Committee of Reserve Bank of India, College of Agricultural Banking, Pune
 Chairman, Banking and Financial Institutions Committee, Federation of Indian Chambers of Commerce & Industry (FICCI) (2010–2012)
 Member, Committee on Customer Services in Banks constituted by Reserve Bank of India (June 2010 – 2012)
 Member, Study Group to examine various alternative models for establishing ICT based mobile banking service centres for inclusive banking in the country constituted by Planning Commission, Government of India (2009–2012)
 Member, High Level Committee to deliberate emergent issues concerning global development in the country constituted by Ministry of Urban Development, Government of India (2010–2012)
 Director, Agriculture Finance Corporation (AFC) Ltd (2006–2012)
 Member, Committee to monitory flow of dollar Export Credit to Exporters constituted by Government of India (2009–2012)
 Ex Officio Member, Board of Trustees, CGTMSE (Credit Guarantee Fund Trust for Micro and Small Enterprises) (2009–2010)
 Member, National Board of Accreditation, All India Council for Technical Education (2008–2010).
 Member, Committee for conducting study of HR issues of Public Sector Banks constituted by Ministry of Finance, Government of India (2009–2010)
 Member, High Powered Committee to review the Lead bank Scheme, set up by Reserve Bank of India (2007–2009)

References

1952 births
Living people
Malayali people
Indian bankers
People from Kasaragod district